The Third Eye is a 1966 Italian horror film. It was directed by Mino Guerrini and stars Franco Nero, Gioia Pascal and Erika Blanc. A young count, who lives with his domineering, jealous mother, begins on a downward spiral into madness after his fiancée dies in a car accident. This was one of Franco Nero's earliest films, before he achieved stardom in the spaghetti western genre. Erika Blanc plays a dual role in the film, portraying both the Count's dead fiancée Laura, as well as Laura's twin sister Daniela.

Joe D'Amato remade the film as 1979's Beyond the Darkness.

Plot
Mino, a wealthy count/ taxidermist living under the thumb of his domineering mother, decides to marry his fiancée Laura, a decision that infuriates not only his jealous mother, but their plotting maid Marta, who has desires of marrying the count someday herself. Before Laura goes out for a drive, Marta sabotages her car's brakes and the poor woman is killed when her car plunges off a cliff. Mino, who was following her in his car, witnesses the accident and salvages his fiancée's corpse from the wreckage, leaving the car in a lake. He works on her in his taxidermy lab, stuffing her like one of his birds, and puts her in their marital bed.
Meanwhile, Marta has gotten rid of Mino's mother by shoving her down a flight of stairs.

Soon after, Mino begins bringing prostitutes to his mansion, where he makes love to them in the same bed in which he keeps his fiancée's stuffed corpse. When the girls see the body and begin screaming, he strangles them to death. Marta discovers the murders and offers to help him dispose of the bodies in acid, if he agrees to marry her and make her the countess. Everything seems to be going her way until Laura's twin sister Daniela shows up at the estate, trying to find out if her sister's body was ever dredged out of the lake by the police. When Mino sees Daniela, his mind snaps and he thinks it is Laura, returned from the dead. He breaks his deal with Marta and tells her to pack her bags and leave the mansion, so that he and Daniela can be married. Marta tries to stab Daniela that night with a huge butcher knife, but Mino intervenes and stabs Marta repeatedly in a gruesome scene that is heavily edited in the Italian release prints. Leaving Marta for dead, Mino kidnaps Daniela and drives out into the country with her, ranting like a lunatic as they drive. But Marta's not dead, and she manages to drag her blood-spattered body to the phone to call the authorities. Before she dies, she alerts the police to the kidnapping, and a manhunt begins to capture Mino before he can harm Daniela.

Cast 
Franco Nero as Mino
Gioia Pascal as Marta 
Erika Blanc as Laura / Daniela
Olga Solbelli as Mino's mother
Marina Morgan as  Woman in the Nightclub

Production
The story of the film came from producer Ermanno Donati who is credited under the pen name Phil Young. The film's credits state the plot is based on famed serial killer Gilles de Rais but this is fictional. The film was originally titled Il freddo bacio della morte, a title that appeared on the French release prints only. It went into production in June 1965. The film was shot at the Villa Parisi.

Release
The Third Eye came into trouble with censors in Italy on its release. On February 28, 1966 the film was rejected as it was considered to be "contrary to the public moral". The rejection also noted that "In addition many scenes of almost full female nudity and excessively graphic intercourses, the film features episodes of necrophilia, close-ups of horrific scenes with blood and brutal violence, presented with real sadism and a protracted insistence which conveys a sense of complacency by part of the makers". The film was later distributed in Italy by Medusa and released on June 11, 1966. It grossed a total of 72 million Italian lire.

See also
 List of horror films of 1966
 List of Italian films of 1966

References
Notes

Sources

External links

1966 films
1966 horror films
Italian horror films
Films directed by Mino Guerrini
Films scored by Francesco De Masi
Films shot in Italy
1960s Italian films